The IWF World Cup in weightlifting is organised by the International Weightlifting Federation (IWF), as well as other weightlifting federations.

Edition

References

 
Weightlifting competitions
weightlifting
Recurring sporting events established in 2019